Appietto is a commune in the Corse-du-Sud department of France on the island of Corsica.

Geography
Appietto is located 17 km from Ajaccio, and stretches from the Gozzi mount to the coastline of the Gulf of Lava. This historic village culminates at 480 meters, while the rest of the town consists of several ancient villages (Volpaja, Lava Listincone, Picchio, Piscia Rossa) and recent subdivisions (Monté Nebbio, Chiosu Vecchiu, Vanghone, Filletta).

The Ruisseau de Lava flows through the commune from east to west.
It enters the sea in the Golfe de Lava, which has been designated a Natura 2000 site.

Sights
 Chapel St Cyr: This chapel is located on the heights of Appietto. It is oriented eastwards. It remains in ruins today.
Ciuttulaghja: An archaeological site in Corsica. It is located in the commune.
Torra di Pelusella: A Genoese tower.

Population

See also
Tour de Pelusella
Communes of the Corse-du-Sud department

References

Communes of Corse-du-Sud